Harpagidia acanthopis is a moth in the family Gelechiidae. It was described by Edward Meyrick in 1932. It is found in Japan.

The wingspan is 16–20 mm.

References

Moths described in 1932
Dichomeridinae